Cristina de Queiroz (born 1944 – death 2017) is a Brazilian writer.

At the age of 30, she won the Jabuti Prize and had one of her texts adapted for the theater in Germany.

She is the author of the short story book "O visitante de verão", which received the 1974 Jabuti Prize, from the Câmara Brasileira do Livro, in the category Author-revelation / adult literature.

The short story "Piano" was published in the short story book "O conto da mulher brasileira", organized by Edla van Steen, Editora Global, 2007.

Cristina has short stories published in collections that bring together João Ubaldo Ribeiro, Hilda Hilst, Murilo Rubião among others.

Bibliography

References

1944 births
20th-century Brazilian women writers
21st-century Brazilian women writers
21st-century Brazilian writers
2017 deaths